The following is the list of places in Bangladesh that underwent a name change in the past. The most common names in English are in bold letters.

Barishal Division 

 Chwandra Deep → Barishal

Dhaka Division 
Anta Gharer Maidan → Victoria Park → Bahadur Shah Park
Ayub Nagar → Sher-e-Bangla Nagar
Bagh-e-Badshahi → Shahbag
Bikrampur → Munshiganj
Fatehabad → Faridpur
Jahangir Nagar → Dacca → Dhaka
Ramna Race Course → Suhrawardy Udyan

Chattogram Division 

Bollua → Noakhali
Chittagong → Chattogram
Daruchini Dwip → Narikel jinjira → St. Martin's Island
Panowa → Palongkee → Cox's Bazar
Sagarnaiya → Chhagalnaiya
Shamshernagar → Feni
Tippera → Roshnabad → Komolangk → Comilla → Cumilla

Khulna Division 

 Baidyanathtala → Mujibnagar
 Jessore → Jashore

Mymensingh Division 

 Nasirabad → Mymensingh

Rajshahi Division 

 Bogra → Bogura
 Nawabganj → Chapai Nawabganj

Sylhet Division 

 Srihatta → Sirhat → Silhat → Sylhet

See also
List of renamed places in India
List of renamed places in Pakistan

References

Cities, renamed
 Renamed
Bangladesh, Renamed
Bangladesh
Bangladesh, cities